Hopping may refer to:

Activities
 Hopping, the act of jumping with one foot
 Freighthopping, the act of surreptitiously riding on a railroad freight car
 Movie hopping, using a single ticket for a movie theater to see more than one movie

People
 Blair Hopping (born 1980), New Zealand sportsman
 Enos D. Hopping (1805–1847), United States Army general of the Mexican–American War
 Ralph Hopping (1868-1941), American entomologist

Other uses
 , an American warship
 The Hoppings, a travelling fun fair held on the Town Moor, Newcastle upon Tyne
 Hopping, the use of hops in brewing beer
 Hopping, also known as Yogic flying

See also
 Hopping Mappy, an arcade game
 Devil Hopping, an album by British band Inspiral Carpets
 Hopping Hill, an area in Milford, Derbyshire, England
 Island hopping (disambiguation)
 Hop (disambiguation)